The 2020–21 Thai League 1 is the 24th season of the Thai League 1, the top Thai professional league for association football clubs, since its establishment in 1996, also known as Toyota Thai League due to the sponsorship deal with Toyota Motor Thailand. A total of 16 teams will compete in the league. The season began on 14 February 2020 and is scheduled to conclude in October 2020.

The 1st transfer window is from 11 November 2019 to 3 February 2020 while the 2nd transfer window is from 15 June 2020 to 12 July 2020.

Chiangrai United are the defending champions, while BG Pathum United, Police Tero and Rayong have entered as the promoted teams from the 2019 Thai League 2.

On March 1, all of Thai League 1 matches between 7 and 31 March will be played behind closed doors as broadcast only events. However, on March 4, the decision changed to postpone all of matches prior to 18 April due to the COVID-19 pandemic in Thailand.

In April 2020, the Football Association of Thailand announced that the season would restart in September 2020 and end in May 2021, with the top four teams after the first half of the season qualifying for the 2021 AFC Champions League. For the 2022 AFC Champions League, the same criteria as applied in previous years will be followed, with the league and Thai FA Cup winners qualifying for the group stage, and the league runners-up and 3rd place qualifying for the play-offs.

Teams
There are 16 clubs in the league, with three promoted teams from Thai League 2 replacing the two teams that were relegated from the 2019 season along with PTT Rayong who folded at the end of the campaign. All clubs that secured Thai League status for the season were subject to approval by the AFC Club Licensing before becoming eligible to participate.

Chainat Hornbill and Chiangmai were relegated at the end of the 2019 season after finishing in the bottom two places of the table. PTT Rayong withdrew from the league after the season, sparing Suphanburi from relegation. They were replaced by 2019 Thai League 2 champions BG Pathum United, whom played under the name Bangkok Glass in the 2018 Thai League 1 campaign. They were joined by runners up Police Tero, who also got promoted at the first time of asking and 3rd place Rayong. Rayong was founded in 2009 and earned promotion to the Thai League 1 for the first time in their history.

Stadium and locations

Note: Table lists in alphabetical order.

Personnel and sponsoring
Note: Flags indicate national team as has been defined under FIFA eligibility rules. Players may hold more than one non-FIFA nationality.

Managerial changes

Foreign Players
The FIFA Transfer Window Period for Thailand was 19 November 2019 to 10 February 2020, and 15 June to 12 July 2020.

League table
The top three teams at the end of the season qualify for the 2022 AFC Champions League.

Positions by round

Qualification for 2021 AFC Champions League
The top four teams after the first half of the season (Round 15) qualify for the 2021 AFC Champions League. The Round 15 match between Chiangrai United and Port, originally scheduled to be played on 5 January 2021, was postponed along with all matches in January 2021 due to the COVID-19 pandemic in Thailand, and could not be played before the 2021 AFC Champions League group stage draw on 27 January 2021, and thus this match would not be taken into account when ranking the third-placed and fourth-placed teams between Chiangrai United and Ratchaburi Mitr Phol.

Positions by round - first half of season
The top four teams after the first half of the season (Round 15) qualified for the 2021 AFC Champions League.

Results by match played

Results

Season statistics

Top scorers
As of 28 March 2021.

Top assists
As of 28 March 2021.

Hat-tricks

Clean sheets 
As of 28 March 2021.

Awards

Monthly awards

Season awards

Attendances

Overall statistical table

Attendances by home match played

Source: Thai League

See also
 2020–21 Thai League 2
 2020–21 Thai League 3
 2020–21 Thailand Amateur League
 2020–21 Thai FA Cup
 2020 Thailand Champions Cup

Notes

References

2020
2020–21 in Asian association football leagues
2020 in Thai football leagues
Association football events postponed due to the COVID-19 pandemic